John Cliff (7 March 1883 – 18 October 1977) was the first Assistant General Secretary of the Transport and General Workers' Union and later a prominent London Transport board member.

Cliff was born in Leeds in 1883, the son of John Cliff and his wife Mary. He joined Leeds Corporation Transport Department on 18 July 1900 as a tram conductor and later became a tram motorman. He married Sarah Ann Scott, who was 19 years his senior, in 1906.

He joined the Amalgamated Association of Tramway and Vehicle Workers and later became the Leeds branch chairman and a member of the National Executive Council. When the National Joint Industrial Council for the Tramways Industry was established in 1919 he became Joint Secretary.

In 1922, the United Vehicle Workers, created in 1919 by amalgamation of the ATVW and the London and Provincial Union of Licensed Vehicle Workers, was one of the unions which merged to form the TGWU. Cliff was appointed National Secretary of the new union's Passenger Services' National Trade Group, overseeing members in the public transport sector throughout the country. In 1924, he became the first Assistant General Secretary of the TGWU, acting as deputy to General Secretary Ernest Bevin.

Cliff was appointed to the London and Home Counties Traffic Advisory Committee in 1924 and remained a member until July 1933, when he became a part-time member of the newly created London Passenger Transport Board. In 1935 he resigned from the TGWU to become a full-time member of the LPTB, with special responsibility for staff, welfare and medical services. In 1948, he became Deputy Chairman of the successor London Transport Executive, a post which he held until his retirement in 1955.

Cliff was also a member of London County Council for many years, being elected alderman in 1937 and Chairman in 1946. He was a Deputy Lieutenant of Middlesex from 1949. He was also a founder member of the British Institute of Management.

Cliff drove the last London tram into New Cross Depot in July 1952. He died at Eastbourne in 1977.

References
Obituary, The Times

1883 births
1977 deaths
Deputy Lieutenants of Middlesex
Trade unionists from Leeds
British trade union leaders
Members of London County Council
People associated with transport in London
Conductor (rail)